Vladimír Brabec (15 May 1934 in Prague – 1 September 2017 in Nová Ves pod Pleší) was a Czech actor.

Selected filmography

Revolucni rok 1848 (1949) - Student
Krízová trojka (1952) - Boy
Velké dobrodruzství (1952) - Cervenka
Návsteva z oblak (1955) - Parachutist - operator
Ztracená stopa (1956)
September Nights (1957)
Malí medvedári (1957) - Vychovatel detského domova
Váhavý strelec (1957)
Cerný prapor (1958)
Desire (1958)
Zivot pro Jana Kaspara (1959) - MUDr. Lipský
Probuzení (1960)
Pochodne (1961) - delnický predák Ladislav Zápotocký
Nocni host (1961) - starsina SNB Vitek Hrabal
Praha nultá hodina (1963) - MUDr. Fahoun
Prosim nebudit! (1963) - Sylaba
Poslední ruze od Casanovy (1966) - Frantisek Adam Valdstejn
The Shield and the Sword (1968, TV Mini-Series) - Jaromir Drobnij
Kapitan Korda (1970) - Korda
Svatby pana Voka (1971) - cisaruv kanclér Slavata
Lekce (1972) - Rohde
Tajemství velikeho vypravece (1972)
Slecna Golem (1972) - Robot at exhibition (voice, uncredited)
Lupič Legenda (1973) - policejní komisar Eminger
Maturita za skolou (1973)
Adam a Otka (1974) - Vladimír Suk
Vysoká modrá zed (1974) - Mjr. Pilar
V kazdém pokoji zena (1974) - Zbynek Bezdek
Thirty Cases of Major Zeman (1976-1980, TV Series) - Maj. Jan Zeman / Richard Lipinski
Osvobození Prahy (1977) - Hlasatel
Náš dědek Josef (1977) - Lovec
Pasiáns (1977) - Karel
Nekonecná nevystupovat (1979)
Stíhán a podezrelý (1979) - Dr. Hein
Rukojmí v Bella Vista (1980) - Mjr. Jan Zeman
Citova výchova jednej Dáse (1980) - Puco Baric
Návštěvníci (1983, TV Series) - Narrator (voice)
Zachvev strachu (1984) - Publisher Sedlaczek
Martha and I (1990)
Stuj, nebo se netrefím (1998) - Halbhuber
Z pekla stestí (1999) - King
Z pekla stestí 2 (2001) - King
Anglické jahody (2008) - Secret Policeman
Pametnice (2009) - Prof. Viktor Verner
Ctyrlístek ve sluzbách krále (2013) - Sendivoj (voice)
Příběh kmotra (2013) - JUDr. Tipl
Tajemství pouze sluzební (2016) - Doctor (final film role)

References

External links

1934 births
2017 deaths
Czechoslovak male film actors
Czech male television actors
20th-century Czech male actors
Czechoslovak male voice actors
Czech male voice actors
Male actors from Prague
Academy of Performing Arts in Prague alumni